Italians in Lebanon (or Italian Lebanese) are a community in Lebanon with a history that goes back to Roman times.

History
In 64 B.C., the Roman general Pompey added Lebanon to the Roman Republic. During and before this time, Phoenicians and Romans exchanged knowledge, habits, and customs. Indeed, the veterans of two Roman legions were established in the city of "Berytus" (modern Beirut): the fifth Macedonian and the third Gallic. The city quickly became Romanized, with the descendants of those legionaries from the Italian peninsula.

Between the 12th and 15th centuries the Italian Republic of Genoa had some Genoese colonies in Beirut, Tripoli, and Byblos.

In more recent times the Italians came to Lebanon in small groups during the World War I and World War II, trying to escape the wars at that time in Europe.
Some of the first Italians who choose Lebanon as a place to settle and find a refuge were Italian soldiers from the Italo-Turkish War in 1911 to 1912. Also most of the Italians chose to settle in Beirut, because of its European style of life. Only a few Italians left Lebanon for France after independence.

Lebanese-Italian relations
Lebanon opened a legation in 1946, which was transformed into an embassy in 1955. Both countries signed a Treaty of Friendship, Cooperation and Navigation in 1949. Both countries are members of the Union for the Mediterranean.

Italy and Lebanon are linked by an ancient friendship, which finds its roots in their common Mediterranean heritage, their antique civilizations and thousands of years of common history, intense trade relations and deep cultural and human exchanges. In the 16th century, the special relationship between Emir Fakhreddine and the Medicis family of Tuscany was instrumental in forging modern Lebanon as we know it today, which is a unique mixture of Western and Arabic cultures. Lebanon also left important traces in Italy’s history: in 1584 the Maronite College was founded in Rome, fostering contacts between clergymen, researchers and young students, which today is being continued under the framework of Inter-University cooperation. This excellent level of bilateral relations between Italy and Lebanon is reinforced today by the common views of the two countries on a number of Middle East issues, and by the growing awareness that in a globalized world the two shores of the Mediterranean sea share the same destiny.

Italian community in Lebanon
The Italian community in Lebanon is very small (about 4,300 people) and it is mostly assimilated into the Lebanese Catholic community.

The intermarriage in the Italian community is very high and most of the younger members are half Italian on the paternal side. In mixed Latin-Maronite or other mixed-rite marriages, the children are raised in the father's rite, and along with bearing the father's surname, identify with the father's ethnic group. Therefore, the children of Italian fathers and Lebanese mothers are counted as Italian, and those of Lebanese fathers and Italian mothers as Lebanese, some last name were modified. There are some Italian families who returned to Italy after World War II together with their Lebanese born children.

There is a growing interest in economic relationships between Italy and Lebanon (like with the "Vinifest 2011"), thanks even to the remaining Italian Lebanese.

Language and religion
Only a small percentage of all remaining Italian Lebanese speak some Italian, while the majority of them speak Arabic as a first language and French and/or English as second language, and are mainly Roman Catholics. Their main organizations are the former Associazione Nazionale Pro Italiani del Libano (ANPIL) and the Istituto Italiano di Cultura di Beirut (IICB).

The Italian Lebanese of the current generations are assimilated to Lebanese society, and most of them speak only Arabic and French and English (only a few young Italian Lebanese know some basic words in Italian). In religion, most of the young generation are Roman Catholics, while only a few young people practise Islam, mainly because of marriage although some are descendants of Italian converts.

Famous Italian Lebanese
 Andrea Paoli, representing Lebanon in Taekwondo at the 2012 Olympic Games held in London
 Philippe Paoli, a Lebanese footballer
 Antonella Lualdi, international actress
 Bruno Carmeni, judoka
 Luca Turin, biophysicist and expert in the art of perfume and fragrance
 Natasha Hovey, actress (born in Beirut, her mother is Italian Lebanese)
 Paul Mazzolini, musician known as Gazebo

See also List of Lebanese people in Italy

See also
 Latin Church in Lebanon
 Lebanon
 Italy
 Italian Empire
 Imperial Italy
 Italy–Lebanon relations
 Italian diaspora
 Roman Lebanon
 Latin Church in the Middle East

References

Bibliography
 Consorti, A. Vicende dell’italianità in Levante, 1815-1915 in: Rivista Coloniale, anno XV.
 Corm, Georges. Il Libano contemporaneo, storia e società. Jaca Book. Milano, 2006
 Favero, Luigi e Tassello, Graziano. Cent'anni di emigrazione italiana (1876-1976). Cser. Roma, 1978.
 Miller, William. The Latin Orient. Bibliobazaar LLC. London, 2009 .
 Ossian De negri, Teofilo. Storia di Genova: Mediterraneo, Europa, Atlantico. Giunti Editore. Firenze, 2003. 
 Touma, Toufic. Paysans et institutions féodales chez les Druses et les Maronites du Liban du XVIIe siècle à 1914. Publications de l'Université Libanaise. Beyrouth, 1971.; 1972

Lebanon
Ethnic groups in Lebanon
 
Society of Lebanon